Modafinil acid (code name CRL-40467), also known as modafinilic acid or modafinil carboxylate, is one of the two major metabolites of modafinil – the other being modafinil sulfone. Modafinil acid is also a metabolite of the modafinil prodrug, adrafinil, and the (R)-(–)-enantiomer is a metabolite of armodafinil, the (R)-(–)-enantiomer of modafinil. Between 30 - 60% of modafinil is converted to modafinil acid and its half life is roughly half that of modafinil (about 7 hours). Modafinil acid seems to be inactive, and similarly to modafinil sulfone, does not appear to contribute to the wakefulness-promoting/psychostimulant effects of modafinil.

In the breakdown process of modafinil, modafinil is primarily hydrolyzed by an esterase or amidase enzyme into modafinil acid. The apparent clearance of modafinil acid is significantly higher than that of modafinil, following the hypothesis that metabolism increases the polarity and the clearance of modafinil.

References 

Carboxylic acids
Human drug metabolites
Sulfoxides